Hohenwulsch is a village and a former municipality in the district of Stendal, in Saxony-Anhalt, Germany. Since 1 January 2010, it has been part of the town of Bismark.

Former municipalities in Saxony-Anhalt
Bismark, Germany